A list of films produced in France in 1963.

See also
 1963 in France

Notes

External links
 French films of 1963 at the Internet Movie Database
French films of 1963 at Cinema-francais.fr

1963
Films
Lists of 1963 films by country or language